Alex Turcotte (born February 26, 2001) is an American professional ice hockey forward currently playing for the Ontario Reign in the American Hockey League (AHL) as a prospect to the Los Angeles Kings of the National Hockey League (NHL). Regarded as one of the top prospects of the 2019 NHL Entry Draft, Turcotte was selected fifth overall by the Kings. Turcotte played at the University of Wisconsin-Madison before signing with the Kings on March 11, 2020.

Playing career
On June 21, 2019, Turcotte was selected in the first round, 5th overall, by the Los Angeles Kings in the 2019 NHL Entry Draft. On March 11, 2020, Turcotte signed an entry-level contract with Kings.

On September 22, 2020, with the 2020–21 season delayed due to the COVID-19 pandemic, Turcotte, along with fellow Kings prospects Akil Thomas, Tyler Madden, Aidan Dudas, and Jacob Ingham, was loaned to Eisbären Berlin of the Deutsche Eishockey Liga. However, his loan spell was terminated a month later, as there was no timetable for the DEL season to begin.

On December 28, 2021, Turcotte made his NHL debut against the Vegas Golden Knights.

International play

Turcotte competed in the 2017–18 World Under-17 Hockey Challenge where his team won the gold medal against Canada. Turcotte assisted on a first period goal in the gold medal game and tallied 6 points in 6 games during the tournament. Later that year, Turcotte played in the 2018 IIHF U18 World Championship where he scored 5 points in 7 games but lost the final game to Finland taking home a silver medal.

Personal life
Turcotte is the son of former NHL forward Alfie Turcotte, who played with the Montreal Canadiens, Winnipeg Jets, and Washington Capitals. Turcotte's grandfather Réal played at Michigan State University, once owned and coached the Nanaimo Islanders of the Western Hockey League, and ran stickhandling camps across North America for more than fifty years. Turcotte's uncle Jeff played for the Toronto Marlboros of the Ontario Hockey League and is currently the head coach of the Los Angeles Jr. Kings U16 team.

Career statistics

Regular season and playoffs

International

References

External links 

2001 births
Living people
American men's ice hockey centers
Ice hockey players from Illinois
Los Angeles Kings draft picks
Los Angeles Kings players
National Hockey League first-round draft picks
Ontario Reign (AHL) players
People from Lake County, Illinois
USA Hockey National Team Development Program players
Wisconsin Badgers men's ice hockey players